20 Persei is a visual binary star in the northern constellation of Perseus, a few degrees from Pi Persei. It is visible to the naked eye as a dim, yellow-white hued point of light with a combined apparent visual magnitude of 5.343. It is receding from the Earth with a heliocentric radial velocity of +6 km/s.

The orbit of the two stars has been calculated from the secondary changing its position relative to the primary. The two orbit each other every 31.6 years with an angular semimajor axis of 0.22 arcseconds and an eccentricity of 0.7560. The combined spectrum of 20 Persei matches that of an F-type main-sequence star, and the two stars are thought to have equal masses, 1.5 times that of the Sun. A ninth-magnitude star, designated 20 Persei C, may be associated with the pair.

References

F-type main-sequence stars
Binary stars
Perseus (constellation)
Durchmusterung objects
Persei, 20
017904
013490
0855